Cambarus tenebrosus, the cavespring crayfish, is a freshwater crayfish native to Alabama, Kentucky, Tennessee, Ohio and Indiana in the United States. It is a facultative cave-dwelling species known from 84 caves over its range and 20 surface locations in the Cumberland Plateau.

References

Cambaridae
Cave crayfish
Freshwater crustaceans of North America
Crustaceans described in 1902